In the 1950–51 season, USM Alger is competing in the Second Division for the 14th season French colonial era, as well as the Forconi Cup. They competing in First Division, and the Forconi Cup.

Competitions

Overview

First Division

League table

Group II

Matches

Forconi Cup

Squad information

Playing statistics

Goalscorers
Includes all competitive matches. The list is sorted alphabetically by surname when total goals are equal.

References

External links
 L'Echo d'Alger : journal républicain du matin

USM Alger seasons
Algerian football clubs 1950–51 season